David Marler (born December 20, 1955) is a former Canadian football quarterback in the Canadian Football League (CFL). He played for the Hamilton Tiger-Cats and Ottawa Rough Riders. Marler played college football at Mississippi State. He was drafted by the Buffalo Bills in the 10th round of the 1979 NFL Draft, but was released.

Marler started for the Tiger-Cats in the 68th Grey Cup.

References

1955 births
Living people
American football quarterbacks
Canadian football quarterbacks
Mississippi State Bulldogs football players
Hamilton Tiger-Cats players
Ottawa Rough Riders players